"Honest" is a song by Dublin-based alternative rock quartet Kodaline. The song was released on 1 February 2015 as the lead single from the band's second studio album, Coming Up for Air (2015). "Honest" became the band's third top 10 single in their home country, Ireland, following "High Hopes" (2013) and "Love Like This" (2013).

Track listing

Charts

Release history

References

Kodaline songs
2015 songs
2015 singles
Songs written by Jacknife Lee
Song recordings produced by Jacknife Lee
B-Unique Records singles